Eupithecia praecipitata is a moth in the family Geometridae. It is found in China.

References

Moths described in 1979
praecipitata
Moths of Asia